John Christian Bullitt is a bronze statue by  John J. Boyle. It is located on the north plaza of Philadelphia City Hall, at  Broad Street, and  JFK Boulevard.
It was unveiled in July 1907.

The inscription reads:
(Lower proper left side:) 
JOHN J BOYLE, SC, 1907 
(Lower proper right side:) 
ROMAN BRONZE WORKS, NEW YORK 
(Base, front:) 
JOHN
CHRISTIAN
BULLITT
1842-1892

See also
 List of public art in Philadelphia

References

External links
http://www.phillyhistory.org/PhotoArchive/detail.aspx?ImageId=42615
http://dcmemorials.com/index_indiv0006532.htm
http://www.waymarking.com/waymarks/WM9EKD_John_Christian_Bullitt_Philadelphia_PA

Monuments and memorials in Philadelphia
Outdoor sculptures in Philadelphia
1907 sculptures
Bronze sculptures in Pennsylvania
Market East, Philadelphia
Statues in Pennsylvania
Sculptures of men in Pennsylvania
1907 establishments in Pennsylvania